Cathy Pearsall-Stipek (née Pearsall; born April 18, 1932) is a former American politician who served as a member of the Washington House of Representatives from 1977 to 1979.  She represented Washington's 29th legislative district as a Democrat.  She served on several committees, including as vice-chair of the labor committee.

After leaving the legislature, she served in many other positions in local government, including the Tacoma School Board (1983–1989), Pierce County Council (1989–1993), Pierce County Auditor (1993–2002), on the Pierce County Charter Review Commission, and at the appointment of Governor Jay Inslee, on the board of Bates Technical College.

Outside the legislature, she was president of consulting and training business Votes Count, Inc. until retiring in 2015.  She also owns or owned two other businesses, Custom Drapery Shop and Cathy's Custom Décor.  She is married with six children.

References

1932 births
Living people
Democratic Party members of the Washington House of Representatives
Women state legislators in Washington (state)
20th-century American politicians
20th-century American women politicians
County auditors in the United States
Pierce County Councillors
School board members in Washington (state)
21st-century American politicians
21st-century American women politicians